Ron Turner may refer to:

Ron Turner (American football) (born 1953), Florida International University's head coach
Ron Turner (illustrator) (1922–1998), British illustrator and comics artist
Ron Turner (water polo) (1929–2007), British water polo player
Ron Turner (coach), USA Swimming
Ronald Turner (1915–1965), Canadian politician
Ronald William Turner (1896–?), English World War I flying ace
Ronald Turner (cricketer) (1885–1915), English cricketer
Ron Turner (rugby league) (born 1945), Australian rugby league footballer
Ronnie Turner (born 1911), Rhodesian international bowler

See also
Turner (surname)